Road Tested is an album by saxophonist Hank Crawford and organist Jimmy McGriff recorded in 1997 and released on the Milestone label.

Reception 

Allmusic's Richard S. Ginell said: "You know what to expect by now -- hardass, down-home, blues-drenched organ trio-plus-sax grooving -- but this is a really potent gusher of that genre ... it's amazing and gratifying that bluesicians are still allowed to make records this way". On All About Jazz Douglas Payne stated "Road Tested, the seventh pairing under both their names, is exactly what you'd expect from these two: the tried and trues of funk and blues ... Road Tested offers some reliably soulful sounds and gotcha-groove for both fatback fans and acid-jazzers".

Track listing
 "Peanuts" (Wayne Boyd) – 6:19
 "I Only Have Eyes for You" (Harry Warren, Al Dubin) – 4:52
 "Happy Feet" (Hank Crawford) – 5:30
 "For Sentimental Reasons" (William Best, Deek Watson) – 5:21
 "Caravan" (Juan Tizol, Duke Ellington, Irving Mills) – 9:01
 "Road Tested" (Jimmy McGriff) – 5:48
 "Hope That We Can Be Together Soon" (Kenny Gamble, Leon Huff) – 5:54
 "Mr. P.C." (John Coltrane) – 3:35
 "Summertime" (George Gershwin, Ira Gershwin, DuBose Heyward) – 5:38
 "A Little Bit South of East St. Louis" (Crawford, McGriff) – 8:53

Personnel
Hank Crawford  – alto saxophone
Jimmy McGriff – Hammond X-B3 organ
Wayne Boyd – guitar
Bernard Purdie − drums

References

Milestone Records albums
Hank Crawford albums
Jimmy McGriff albums
1997 albums
Albums produced by Bob Porter (record producer)
Albums recorded at Van Gelder Studio